Stone Valley Recreation Area is an outdoor recreational and educational facility operated by Pennsylvania State University. It is located in Huntingdon County near the village of Mooresville. The  property is located over the mountain from the village of Pine Grove Mills, Pennsylvania, along Shaver's Creek.  Hiking and fishing are among the activities available to visitors.

Pennsylvania State University contracted with the federal government in 1940 to construct roads and buildings on the land to help the school's educational program. In 1954 the land was given fully to the university. A dam was finished in 1960 to give easy access to the area, and Stone Valley Recreation Area was created.

Stone Valley Recreation Area is a multi-use park that is shared by the Penn State Forestry department, Shaver's Creek Environmental Center and Stone Valley Vertical Adventures.

Vertical Adventures, which is operated by Penn State Student Affairs is a multi-element high-ropes challenge course serving the university and surrounding community with team development and group building.  It also hosts a small summer program for middle school and high school children.

The lake at Stone Valley Recreation Area was drained in 2008 when state regulations regarding dam specifications changed.  Lake Perez was filled back up in 2014 and is on the Pennsylvania Fish and Boat Commission's restocking list. All boating and fishing activities resumed as of April 2014.

References

External links 
Stone Valley website
Stone Valley at Trails.com

Pennsylvania State University
Protected areas of Huntingdon County, Pennsylvania